Harden House is a historic home located at Lima in Livingston County, New York. It was built about 1885 and is a two-story frame dwelling in the Queen Anne style.  Also on the property is a 19th-century carriage house.

It was listed on the National Register of Historic Places in 1989.

References

Houses on the National Register of Historic Places in New York (state)
Queen Anne architecture in New York (state)
Houses completed in 1885
Houses in Livingston County, New York
National Register of Historic Places in Livingston County, New York